The following is a list of flags of Malta.

National flags

Governmental flags

Military flags

Historical flags

Local Councils
Some flags had been used prior to the creation of local councils in 1993. The coats of arms of the local councils are officially recognised, however the flags are not and thus a number of variants exist. Since 1993, a new local council, Mtarfa, has been created, and the local councils of Attard, Birżebbuġa, Floriana, Kalkara, Lija, Mellieħa, Mġarr, Mosta, Nadur, Naxxar, Paola, Qrendi, Siġġiewi, Xgħajra and Żebbuġ have changed their flags and coats of arms. Some, such as Mosta, had minor differences, but others, like Xgħajra changed the arms completely.

Malta

Gozo

Political flags

Religious flags

See also
 Flag of Malta
 Coat of arms of Malta

References

Flags of Malta
Lists and galleries of flags
Flags
National symbols of Malta